Athymoris paramecola is a moth in the family Lecithoceridae. It is found in China (Hainan).

References

Moths described in 1996
Moths of Asia
Endemic fauna of China
Athymoris